Gene Edwards is a former president of the United States Soccer Federation, and is a member of the U.S. Soccer Hall of Fame and the CONCACAF Hall of Fame.

Edwards had been a vice president of U.S. Soccer since 1968. Edwards was president of the United States Soccer Federation from 1974 to 1984. Edwards also served as a member of the FIFA Amateur Committee, the CONCACAF Executive Committee, and the Executive Committee of the United States Olympic Committee. Edwards was coach of the United States teams at the 1971 and 1975 Pan-American Games and the 1972 Olympic Games. Edwards was inducted into the U.S. Soccer Hall of Fame in 1985.

References

American soccer coaches
National Soccer Hall of Fame members

Living people

Year of birth missing (living people)
Place of birth missing (living people)
Presidents of the United States Soccer Federation